Joey Paccagnella (born 10 January 1981 in Dolo) is an Italian female synchronized swimmer who competed in the 2004 Summer Olympics.

References

External links 
 
 
 

1981 births
Living people
Italian synchronized swimmers
Olympic synchronized swimmers of Italy
Synchronized swimmers at the 2004 Summer Olympics
Sportspeople from the Metropolitan City of Venice
People from Dolo